Kornél Khiesz (born 19 October 1992) is a Hungarian professional footballer who plays for Balatonfüred.

Career statistics
.

References

1992 births
Living people
People from Veszprém
Hungarian footballers
Association football defenders
Puskás Akadémia FC players
Budafoki LC footballers
Nemzeti Bajnokság I players
Nemzeti Bajnokság II players
Sportspeople from Veszprém County